Bulmuş is a village in the Tercan District, Erzincan Province, Turkey. The village is populated by Kurds of the Balaban tribe and had a population of 129 in 2021.

The hamlets of Balabanlı, Boyacı, Karabeyler, Kurtdere, Palanka and Petekçi are attached to the village.

References 

Villages in Tercan District
Kurdish settlements in Erzincan Province